

Cenwulf was a medieval Bishop of Winchester, and had been abbot of Peterborough before that. He was consecrated and died in 1006.

Citations

References

External links
 

Bishops of Winchester
11th-century English Roman Catholic bishops
10th-century births
1006 deaths
Year of birth unknown